Władysław Prymka (5 June 1895 – 29 June 1963) was a Polish footballer. He played in one match for the Poland national football team in 1922.

References

External links
 

1895 births
1963 deaths
Polish footballers
Poland international footballers
Place of birth missing
Association footballers not categorized by position